Luigi Crespellani (February 22, 1897 – April 15, 1967) was an Italian lawyer and politician.

He was a member of Christian Democracy; he served as Mayor of Cagliari from 1946 to 1949 and he was defined "Mayor of reconstruction".

On 31 May 1949 he became the first President of Sardinia, a position he held until 7 January 1954. He later headed the Credito Industriale Sardo. He was elected to the Senate of the Republic for two terms and he held office from 1958 to 1967, the year of his death.

Honours and awards 
 : Knight of the Order of Merit of the Italian Republic

References

1897 births
1967 deaths
People from Cagliari
Christian Democracy (Italy) politicians
Senators of Legislature III of Italy
Senators of Legislature IV of Italy
Presidents of Sardinia
Mayors of Cagliari
Crespellani
20th-century Italian lawyers